Eleni Christofi (born 9 August 1998) is a Greek junior tennis player.

Career
Christofi has a career-high doubles ranking by the WTA of 533, achieved on 9 May 2016. She has won six doubles titles on the ITF Circuit.

On the junior tour, Christofi has a career high junior ranking of 61, achieved in January 2016.

Playing for Greece in Fed Cup, Christofi has a win–loss record of 3–0.

Junior career

Grand Slam performance
Singles:
 Australian Open: 1R (2016)
 French Open: 1R (2016)
 Wimbledon: Q2 (2015, 2016)
 US Open: Q2 (2015)

Doubles:
 Australian Open: 1R (2016)
 French Open: QF (2016)
 Wimbledon: QF (2016)
 US Open: 1R (2015)

ITF finals

Doubles: 10 (6 titles, 4 runner–ups)

External links
 
 

1998 births
Living people
Greek female tennis players
Georgia Lady Bulldogs tennis players